Gospel Church is a Protestant church situated on Tiantai Road in Wanzhou District, Chongqing. Built in 1901, it was originally an Anglican church in the Diocese of Western China (also, Diocese of Szechwan).

History 

Protestantism was first introduced to Wanzhou (then known as Wanhsien [Wan County], was part of Sichuan Province) by a British Anglican missionary in 1882. The first baptism took place in 1896, conducted by two British missionaries, with 16 locals being baptised into Anglican Church.

In 1901, a residential property on Sanma Road was purchased for 2400 taels of sycee by the local Anglican missionary Chao Shang-lien, and was converted into a place of worship named Gospel Church. In 1919, the East Szechwan School of Theology was established by a British missionary in Wanhsien. Along with the Lutheran Holy Cross Church, the church became one of the county's main venues for Protestant worship.

The Wanhsien incident in 1926 forced all foreign missionaries out of Sichuan, the congregation had sunk into slumber since then. It was not until 1934, when the pastor Andrew Gih led a group of missionaries from the Shanghai Bethel Mission, entered Wanhsien to set up a special sermon which lasted for a week, that revived the church.

After the communist takeover of China in 1949, Christian Churches in China were forced to sever their ties with respective overseas Churches, which has thus led to the merging of Gospel Church into the communist-established Three-Self Patriotic Church.

During the 2000s, in order to support Three Gorges Project, the church was moved to its present location and rebuilt in neo-Romanesque style.

See also 
 Anglicanism in Sichuan
 :Category:Former Anglican churches in Sichuan

References

External links 
 Front and side views of Gospel Church 
 Interior of Gospel Church 

Wanzhou
20th-century Anglican church buildings
20th-century churches in China
Churches completed in the 1900s
Churches completed in the 2000s
Wanzhou
Rebuilt churches
Romanesque Revival church buildings in China